Marion County Public Schools (MCPS) is a public school district that covers Marion County, Florida. The district has its headquarters in Ocala, Florida.

School Board

District 1: Mrs. Allison Campbell, 2020-2024
District 2: Mr. Don Browning, 2021-2022
District 3: Mr. Eric Cummings, 2018-2022
District 4: Ms. Nancy Thrower (School Board Chair), 2018-2022
District 5: Mrs. Kelly King (Vice Chair), 2018-2022

Schools

Higher education schools
Marion Technical College

High schools
Belleview High School
Dunnellon High School
Forest High School
Lake Weir High School
Marion Technical Institute
North Marion High School
Vanguard High School
West Port High School

Middle schools
Osceola Middle School
Belleview Middle School
Dunnellon Middle School
Fort King Middle School
Fort McCoy School (K-8th)
Horizon Academy at Marion Oaks (5th-8th)
Howard Middle School
Lake Weir Middle School
Liberty Middle School
North Marion Middle School

Elementary schools
Anthony Elementary School
Belleview Elementary School
Belleview-Santos Elementary School
College Park Elementary School
Dr. N.H. Jones Elementary (Magnet)
Dunnellon Elementary School
East Marion Elementary School
Eighth Street Elementary School
Emerald Shores Elementary School
Evergreen Elementary School (Closed in May 2021)
Fessenden Elementary School
Fort McCoy School (K-8)
Greenway Elementary School
Hammett Bowen Elementary School
Harbour View Elementary School
Legacy Elementary School
Madison Street Elementary (Magnet)
Maplewood Elementary School
Marion Oaks Elementary School
Oakcrest Elementary School
Ocala Springs Elementary School
Reddick-Collier Elementary School
Romeo Elementary School
Saddlewood Elementary School
Shady Hill Elementary School
South Ocala Elementary School
Sparr Elementary School
Stanton-Weirsdale Elementary School
Sunrise Elementary School
Ward-Highlands Elementary School
Wyomina Park Elementary School

Center Schools
Hillcrest School
Silver River Mentoring and Instruction
New Leaf Center

Charter schools
Ina A. Colon Academy
Marion Military Academy 
Marion Charter School
McIntosh Charter School
Ocali Charter Middle School

Virtual schools
Marion E-learning 
Marion Virtual

References

External links
 Marion County Public Schools

School districts in Florida
Education in Marion County, Florida
School districts established in 1869
1869 establishments in Florida